Mengkubau National Housing Scheme (abbreviated as RPN Mengkubau), commonly known as Panchor National Housing Scheme, is a public housing estate in Brunei-Muara District, Brunei, in the mukim (subdistrict) of Mentiri. It is one of the public housing estates of under the programme of its namesake, which is a government housing programme for the citizens of Brunei.

References 

Public housing estates in Brunei
Villages in Brunei-Muara District